Curnonidae is a small family of sea slugs, nudibranchs, shell-less marine gastropod molluscs, in the clade Euthyneura.

Description
The Curnonidae are a small family of nudibranchs with representatives in the Southern Ocean including South Africa.

Etymology 
The genus name was originally a tribute to Dr. Jean Charcot, who led the expedition which discovered this species.

Genera 
Genera and species within the family Curnonidae include:
 Curnon d'Udekem d'Acoz, 2017
 Curnon granulosa (Vayssière, 1906) 
 Pseudotritonia Thiele, 1912
 Pseudotritonia antarctica (Odhner, 1934)
 Pseudotritonia gracilidens Odhner, 1944
 Pseudotritonia quadrangularis Thiele, 1912 
Names brought into synonymy:
 Charcotia Vayssière, 1906 : synonym of Curnon d'Udekem d'Acoz, 2017 (invalid: junior homonym of Charcotia Chevreux, 1906 (January) [Amphipoda]; Curnon is a replacement name)
 Telarma Odhner, 1934 synonym of Pseudotritonia Thiele, 1912

References 

Euthyneura
Nudibranchia
Nudipleura